Living with Michael Jackson is a television documentary in which the British journalist Martin Bashir interviewed the American singer Michael Jackson from May 2002 to January 2003. It was broadcast in the United Kingdom on ITV (as a Tonight with Trevor McDonald special) on 3 February 2003, and in the United States three days later on ABC, introduced by Barbara Walters. Jackson took Bashir on a tour of his home, Neverland Ranch, and discussed his family, unhappy childhood, plastic surgery and relationships with children.

In November 2003, the BBC aired Louis, Martin & Michael, a documentary by the British filmmaker Louis Theroux, who had lost out to Bashir to make the documentary. In December 2003, following controversy raised from Bashir's documentary, Jackson was charged with seven counts of child molestation and two counts of intoxicating a minor with alcohol, all of which he was acquitted of in a court of law in June 2005.

Summary

Living with Michael Jackson begins at Neverland Ranch, where Michael Jackson and Martin Bashir tour the estate's grounds and face off in a racecar match. Later, Jackson explains he writes the songs by composing lyrics and not the music, because the music "will write itself." Upon being requested by Bashir, he demonstrates that through dancing, he becomes the physical embodiment of the music. Afterwards, the singer admits that the house's theme of Peter Pan is inspirational because he feels he is Pan. They go out to the Giving Tree, a tree in which Jackson gets inspiration to write his songs. While watching footage of the Jackson 5, he gets emotional upon recalling how his father Joe would watch his sons rehearse the dance steps with a belt in his hand and physically abuse them if they made any misstep. He states that he felt a deep fear of his father, and that is why he never laid a hand on his children. Bashir notes that this must have left a deep impact on the young Michael.

After Neverland, Bashir followed him to the Four Seasons Hotel in Las Vegas. In Las Vegas, Jackson speaks about his love life, his changing appearance, and his children. When Bashir inquires if he had any girlfriends when he was young, Jackson recounts a time when one-time girlfriend Tatum O'Neal wanted to make love to him, but he backed down because he was not ready. Bashir and Jackson also visited a shopping center where Jackson reportedly spent over $1 million in one store on furniture for a new house. The subject of his changing appearance is brought up, but an agitated Jackson denies deliberately bleaching his skin, using implants in his cheeks, having a cleft put in his chin, having his lips enlarged, or having his eyelids reconstructed, claiming that the media is ignorant of what they do not understand. Jackson mentions he suffered horrible bouts of acne as a teenager, and his father would repeatedly insult him by making fun of his nose. Afterward, Bashir gets to meet the Jackson children Prince and Paris, who wore masks to conceal their appearance. Jackson then went to Berlin, Germany. This is where the "baby dangling" incident occurred. Jackson also visited Berlin Zoo and a charity auction, and received a humanitarian award at the Bambi Awards.

Back in Neverland, Gavin Arvizo is interviewed and states that it was Jackson's support that helped him beat his bout with cancer. Jackson admits that sometimes when Gavin stayed with him, Jackson let him sleep in his bed while he slept on the floor. This was corroborated in a separate, unrelated interview by Frank Cascio who confirmed Jackson had insisted he be present in the room as a chaperone. Frank slept on the floor next to Jackson. When asked what he gets out of his involvement with children, the singer replies that he gains joy, because "my greatest inspiration comes from kids". After this, Bashir says he feels uneasy about what he views as an apparent obsession with children. He says that he will have to confront Jackson on certain areas of his life about which he feels he had been less than honest.

During January 2003, Bashir meets with Jackson in Miami for the final interview and brings up the subject of his face. A visibly upset Jackson says that he has only had two operations on his nose in order to facilitate his singing, to which Bashir tries to ask how he looks so much different from when he was an adolescent. After the singer states that there is nothing wrong with plastic surgery, and that it was "not invented for Michael Jackson," Bashir comes to the conclusion that Jackson wanted to change his appearance as a result of his troubled youth and father's insults. When he asks about a comment Jackson's son Prince made, "I haven't got a mother", Jackson tells him that Debbie Rowe bore his two children as a gift for him because he wanted to be a father so badly. On the subject of Blanket's mother, Jackson contradicts his earlier statement that he had Blanket with a woman with whom he had a relationship by stating that Blanket's mother was a surrogate mother and that they did not know each other. Bashir also repeatedly questions Jackson why he invites children into his room. Jackson defended himself stating that such activity is natural when the children are of close friends or family, and that "many children," including the Culkin family children (Macaulay and Kieran) have slept in the same bed as him. Jackson strongly denied that there was any sexual motivation for this. During these defensive comments, he also stated that he would allow his children to stay with his friends, including Barry Gibb, saying that they are "sweet people" and are not "Jack the Ripper".

Reception

Criticism
Michael Jackson felt betrayed by Martin Bashir and complained that the film gives a distorted picture of his behavior and conduct as a father. He said that in the final version of his interview, Bashir used only material that supported the negative view Bashir was portrayed as holding towards Jackson. In response, Jackson and his personal cameraman released a rebuttal interview, which showed Bashir complimenting Jackson on his abilities as a father and his grace under pressure.

"I haven't seen that documentary," remarked Madonna, "but it sounds disgusting, like Bashir exploited a friendship. Publicly humiliating someone for your own gain will only come back to haunt you. I can assure you, all these people will be sorry. God's going to have his revenge."

Oasis guitarist Noel Gallagher slammed the documentary as "typical British journalism", stating in Jackson's defence, "Any man that has got a fairground in his backgarden and can say to a child, 'I'm going to build a water park behind that mountain', give him a round of applause. He seems like a very passionate and caring father so let's not tear him up".

Bashir stated: "I don't believe that I've betrayed Michael Jackson at all. I agreed that we would make an honest film about his life. The film was fair to his musical achievement and gave him every opportunity to explain himself. I'm not accusing anybody of being a child molester or a paedophile." Bashir was the first witness for the prosecution in Jackson's child molestation trial. He refused to answer questions from defense attorneys. Following Jackson's death in 2009, Bashir said Jackson "was never convicted of any crime, and I never saw any wrongdoing myself, and whilst his lifestyle may have been a bit unorthodox, I don't believe he was a criminal".

In 2021, Michael Jackson's UK publicist Mark Borkowski stated that he had discouraged him from doing the documentary with Bashir. In the same year, many fans demanded an investigation to examine the circumstances surrounding the documentary after it was revealed that Bashir had used fake documents to secure an interview with Diana, Princess of Wales in 1995. Jackson's family also reacted by criticizing Bashir for hoodwinking him and manipulating the footage, and stated that they were considering legal action.

Rebuttal video

In an attempt to repair his image, Michael Jackson released a second interview, The Michael Jackson Interview: The Footage You Were Never Meant To See, broadcast on Fox in the United States even though NBC reportedly bid $5 million for the footage, Jackson sold the footage to Fox Network for £1.6 million. It was aired on Sky One in the U.K. This was presented by Maury Povich and contains material which Bashir omitted. It also features new interviews with people close to Jackson, such as his former wife Debbie Rowe, parents Joseph and Katherine, brother Jermaine and close friend Elizabeth Taylor. In this interview, Rowe claimed it was at her request that the children wore masks in public. She also pointed out that the concept of "sharing a bed" can be misunderstood: for example, she herself likes watching television in bed; when she has a visitor, they both watch television together in bed. It also contains interviews with Bashir giving very different opinions to those he had given in interviews as well as in the voice-overs. He is shown praising Jackson as a father as well as saying that he thinks it is wonderful that he allows children to come to Neverland, though he had made previous statements that Neverland Ranch was a "dangerous place" for children  (a direct contradiction of his later statement that he did not believe Michael Jackson was a criminal).

The footage that they show in this documentary was filmed by Hamid Moslehi privately. He states that he was not "secretly" videotaping the interviews, as was popularly believed. He said Bashir knew they were also filming, but that Bashir probably did not know that when he told his camera crew to cut, that he was still filming.

Part of the footage was not aired because videographer Hamid Moslehi refused to hand it over, owing to a financial dispute with Jackson. It was found by police in a search of Moslehi's home in November 2003, and showed the accuser's family praising Jackson.

Bashir said a 16-second clip was being used to portray him as being unfair when he had interviewed Jackson for more than 10 hours.

In the US 14 million watched Jackson rebut Bashir's piece on the Fox channel. The program's UK debut on Sky One drew more than two million viewers, making it the third-biggest show in the channel's history.

Ratings
The UK airing had 15 million viewers while 38 million watched the 2-hour special on ABC.

In popular culture 

On 14 March 2003, the BBC produced a special spoof parody of the documentary, entitled "Lying to Michael Jackson". The sketch showed Michael Jackson, played by comedian Lenny Henry, being interviewed and followed around for the documentary by Martin Bashir, played by Rowan Atkinson.

The miniseries was also parodied in the British sketch comedy series Bo Selecta.

References

External links
 

2003 controversies
2003 television specials
American Broadcasting Company television specials
British television documentaries
ITV documentaries
Documentary films about Michael Jackson
Criticism of journalism
Media bias controversies